Poorvisha S. Ram (born 24 January 1995) is an Indian badminton player who specializes in doubles and mixed doubles. As of February 2020, she is ranked 48 in doubles. She had attained career best ranking of 30 in November 2018. She was previously ranked 3 in doubles at national level.

Biography 
Poorvisha was born in 1995, in Bangalore, Karnataka. She completed her early education at Sishu Griha Montessori and High School, in Bangalore. Poorvisha started playing badminton in 2005 and represented Karnataka at national level in 2007. She won her first competitive tournament at the age of 13 in 2008 when she won a national level inter-school tournament.

In 2009, Poorvisha won silver medal at the 35th National Sports Festival for Women at Margao, Goa. She has won the national championship in junior circuit consecutively for three years in 2010, 2011 and 2012. In December 2012, Poorvisha represented India at Li-Ning Singapore Youth International Series and won silver medal in the women's double event.

Initially, Poorvisha trained at B. N. Sudhakar Academy in Bangalore but moved to Hyderabad in 2013 where she trained under Pullela Gopichand at Gopichand Badminton Academy, Hyderabad. Currently, she trains under Arun Vishnu and Pradnya Gadre along with Gopichand.

Poorvisha won her first senior title in 2015 at Uganda International double event with N. Sikki Reddy. Later that year, she won Bahrain International with Arathi Sara Sunil. In late 2015, Poorvisha was out for sixteen weeks due to career ending lateral and medical epicondylitis, however, she recovered and made a come back in early 2016.

In 2016, Poorvisha partnered with Meghana Jakkampudi and won Nepal International in Kathmandu. Since 2016, Poorvisha has spent her double career in partnership with Jakkampudi whereas in mixed doubles, she partners with Krishna Prasad Ganga. In 2017, Poorvisha and Jakkampudi appeared in various international competitions including 2017 Syed Modi International Grand Prix Gold and 2017 All England Super Series Premier. They reached the finals of Tata Open India International in 2018. In 2019, the pair appeared in Russian Open semifinals where they lost to Japanese pair of Miki Kashihara and Miyuki Kato.

Achievements

BWF International Challenge/Series (5 titles, 3 runners-up) 
Women's doubles

Mixed doubles

  BWF International Challenge tournament
  BWF International Series tournament
  BWF Future Series tournament

References

External links
 

1995 births
Living people
Racket sportspeople from Bangalore
21st-century Indian women
21st-century Indian people
Indian female badminton players
Sportswomen from Karnataka
20th-century Indian women